Bernabé Ballester Marco (born 12 February 1982 in Xàtiva, Valencia), commonly known as Berna, is a Spanish former footballer who played as a central defender, currently manager of Atzeneta UE.

Honours
Spain U16
UEFA European Under-16 Championship: 1999

References

External links

1982 births
Living people
People from Xàtiva
Sportspeople from the Province of Valencia
Spanish footballers
Footballers from the Valencian Community
Association football defenders
Segunda División B players
Tercera División players
Real Madrid C footballers
Real Madrid Castilla footballers
Valencia CF Mestalla footballers
CD Alcoyano footballers
CF Gandía players
Ontinyent CF players
Real Avilés CF footballers
CD Olímpic de Xàtiva footballers
Belgian Pro League players
Royal Excel Mouscron players
Spain youth international footballers
Spanish expatriate footballers
Expatriate footballers in Belgium
Spanish expatriate sportspeople in Belgium
Spanish football managers
Tercera División managers
Tercera Federación managers